The 1980 Avis British Open Championships was held at the Wembley Squash Centre and the Wembley Conference Centre in London from 4–13 March 1980. Geoff Hunt won his seventh title defeating Qamar Zaman in the final. This seventh win equalled the record previously set by Hashim Khan of Pakistan. The squash world was still recovering from the sudden deaths of Torsam Khan and Kim Bruce-Lockhart who both died from heart attacks whilst playing squash. Torsam Khan died during November 1979 and Kim Bruce-Lockhart died in January 1980.

Seeds

Draw and results

Final
 Geoff Hunt beat  Qamar Zaman 9-3 9-2 1-9 9-1

Section 1

Section 2

References

Men's British Open Squash Championships
Men's British Open Squash Championships
Men's British Open Squash Championships
Men's British Open Squash Championships
Men's British Open Squash Championships
Squash competitions in London